Eichberg may refer to:

Eichberg (surname)
Eichberg, St. Gallen, Switzerland
Eichberg, Austria, a town in Styria, Austria
Eichberg Tower, an observation tower near Emmendingen, Germany
, a German cargo ship in service 1944-45